Camelia Hotea (née Balint; born 27 October 1984) is a Romanian retired handballer who last played Minaur Baia Mare.

She was made Honorary Citizen of Baia Mare in 2007.

Achievements
EHF Challenge Cup:
Finalist: 2003 
EHF Cup:
Semifinalist: 2016

Individual awards
 HCM Baia Mare's Player of the Year: 2003, 2007
 Maramureș County Sportswoman of the Year: 2007

References

Sportspeople from Baia Mare
1984 births
Living people
Romanian female handball players 
Handball players at the 2016 Summer Olympics
Olympic handball players of Romania
CS Minaur Baia Mare (women's handball) players